Chaetopsis massyla is a species of ulidiid or picture-winged fly in the genus Chaetopsis of the family Ulidiidae. It has been recorded from North America.

References

massyla
Insects described in 1849